My Own True Love is a 1949 American drama film directed by Compton Bennett and written by Arthur Kober, Josef Mischel and Theodore Strauss. The film stars Phyllis Calvert, Melvyn Douglas, Wanda Hendrix, Philip Friend, Binnie Barnes and Alan Napier. The film was released on February 2, 1949, by Paramount Pictures.

It is an adaptation of the novel Make You a Fine Wife by Yolanda Foldes. In postwar England, a woman is emotionally torn when her fiancée's son returns from the army and they strike up a potential romance.

Synopsis
Shortly after VE Day, widowed Colonel Clive Heath encounters ATS Joan Clews at the barracks where his daughter Sheila, a corporal, is stationed. He has been working in the Army film unit, while he discovers that Joan has spent some time imprisoned by the Germans who caught her in France assisting escaping RAF airmen. Encouraged by his daughter they head out on a date, but his elaborate plans for a dinner in London are cut short by engine failure in his car.

The two bond, but problems arise when Clive's son who had been thought dead at the hands of the Japanese is discovered alive in a Malay village, but missing a leg. His old spark is gone and his father is discouraged, particularly when he shows more interest in Joan who his father has become engaged to. She tries to help him, working out that his attraction to her is a displacement to the Malaysian wife and child he lost when the Japanese captured the village. Father and son are eventually reconciled.

Cast 
Phyllis Calvert as Joan Clews
Melvyn Douglas as Clive Heath
Wanda Hendrix as Sheila Heath
Philip Friend as Michael Heath
Binnie Barnes as Geraldine
Alan Napier as Kittredge
Arthur Shields as Iverson
Phyllis Morris as Mrs. Peach
Richard Webb as Corporal
 Wilson Benge as	Waiter
 Clifford Brooke as 	Coffee Stall Proprietor 
 Peter Coe as Rene 
 George Douglas as 	Cutter 
 Betty Fairfax as Woman in Hut 
 Jean Fenwick as 	Corporal 
 Leyland Hodgson as 	Taxi Driver 
 Robin Hughes as 	English Officer 
 T. Arthur Hughes as 	Doorman 
 Miriam Jordan as 	Miss Robinson 
 Paul Kreibich as 	Maitre d'Hotel 
 Mary MacLarena s 	Woman in Hut 
 Joseph Marr as 	Proprietor 
 William Meader as Room Clerk 
 Marie Osborne as Woman Passenger 
 David Thursby as Mechanic 
 Norma Varden a	Red Cross Nurse 
Ernö Verebes as Captain of Waiters 
Patrick Whyte as 	Flight Lieutenant

Production
The film was based on the novel Make You a Fine Wife. Paramount, who had already bought Golden Earrings by the same author, bought the screen rights in September 1946. Val Lewton was assigned to produce and Leonore Coffee given the job of writing the script.

In December 1946 Paramount announced they had signed a contract with Phyllis Calvert — then in Los Angeles making her Hollywood debut with Time Out of Mind. She was to make six films, three over two years then one a year after that, starting with Make You a Fine Wife. In February 1947 Paramount announced the film version would be called My Own True Love. Calvert returned to England to make a film then came back to Hollywood for My Own True Love'.

In April 1947 Compton Bennett signed to direct. By June Wanda Hendrix and Melvyn Douglas were set as co stars; they were the only Americans in the lead cast. Filming started in July. It was shot entirely in Los Angeles.

In September, while the film was still being shot, it was reported that the filmmakers had still not decided who Calvert's character should end up with. "In England we wouldn't worry about it," said Calvert. "It'd be either 'A' or 'U' and make big money."

In October 1947 Calvert returned to London, where she appeared in a production of Peter Pan.

 References 

Bibliography
 Edmund G. Bansak. Fearing the Dark: The Val Lewton Career''. McFarland, 2003.

External links 
 

1949 films
Paramount Pictures films
American drama films
1949 drama films
Films directed by Compton Bennett
Films produced by Val Lewton
Films scored by Robert Emmett Dolan
Films set in London
Films based on British novels
American black-and-white films
1940s English-language films
1940s American films